Sasa Sestic (born 24 October 1978) is a Bosnian-Australian barista from Canberra, Australian Capital Territory who won the 2015 World Barista Championship.

Australian champion barista
Sestic won the Australian Barista Championship run by the Australian Specialty Coffee Association in March 2015, at his seventh attempt.

Sestic pays attention to the freshness of his coffee beans. "I've looked at a calendar and seen when coffee will ripen in each country." "Seasonality is very important and we knew that the season would finish in Colombia from September to October." "Just like fruit and vegetables, when they're in season they taste great. It's the same thing with coffee."

World Barista Championship
As Australian champion, Sestic won the right to compete in the 2015 World Barista Championship held in Seattle, United States.

Sestic was selected into the final six, then won the finals round of four espressos, four cappuccinos and four signature drinks judged by sensory and technical judges plus a head judge.

The specialty coffee presented by Sestic contained a dash of Shiraz Viognier blended wine, ranked as an 'exceptional' wine, made at Clonakilla winery near Canberra.

Sestic is Founder of Ona Coffee and Project Origin 
Sestic owns Ona Coffee at 5 locations  
 The Cupping Room (University Avenue)
 Ona Fyshwick (Wollongong Street) including a wholesale bean outlet
 Highroad, Dickson
 Ona Sydney 
 Ona Melbourne

Sport
Sestic represented Australia in Men's competition for Handball at the 2000 Summer Olympics in Sydney. He is the brother of Dragan Sestic.

References

External links
 Ona Coffee

1978 births
Living people
Baristas
Handball players at the 2000 Summer Olympics
Olympic handball players of Australia
Australian male handball players
People from Canberra
People from the Australian Capital Territory
Serbian emigrants to Australia
Australian people of Serbian descent